Mischii is a commune in Dolj County, Oltenia, Romania with a population of 1,826 people. It is composed of six villages: Călinești, Gogoșești, Mischii, Mlecănești, Motoci and Urechești.

References

Communes in Dolj County
Localities in Oltenia